The 1998 FIBA Women's World Championship (German: 1998 FIBA Frauen-Weltmeisterschaft) was hosted by Germany from May 26 to June 7, 1998.  The USA won the tournament, defeating Russia 71-65 in the final.

Venues
 Münster
 Wuppertal
 Rotenburg/Fulda
 Karlsruhe
 Dessau
 Bremen
 Berlin

Competing nations

Squads

Preliminary round

Group A

Group B

Group C

Group D

Second round
Scores and results from the first round shall be carried over to the second round.

Group E

Group F

Classification stage

13–16th place playoffs

9–12th place playoffs

Final round

Bracket

Quarterfinals

Classification 5th–8th

Final standings

Awards

References
Results
1998 FIBA World Championship for Women

W
B
FIBA Women's Basketball World Cup
B
Women's basketball competitions in Germany
May 1998 sports events in Europe
June 1998 sports events in Europe